Christmas (also known as Mannheim Steamroller Christmas) is the first Christmas album and sixth studio album released by American musical group Mannheim Steamroller. It was the band's first album to chart on the Billboard 200 album chart, peaking at No. 50.

On June 21, 2004, the album was certified 6× Platinum by the Recording Industry Association of America for shipment of six million copies in the United States since its 1984 release, making it one of the best-selling Christmas/holiday albums in the U.S.

Seven of the album's 11 tracks were included in the group's 2004 compilation Christmas Celebration.

As of November 2014, it was the seventh best-selling Christmas/holiday album in the U.S. during the Nielsen SoundScan era of music sales tracking (March 1991 – present), having sold a total of 3,500,000 copies during that period according to SoundScan.

2019 marked the 35th anniversary of the album, which was celebrated with special-edition vinyl and compact disc releases.

Track listing

Personnel 

 Louis F. "Chip" Davis Jr. - drums, percussion (including camel bells), recorder, bells, dulcimer, crumhorn, vocals, pencil, dry ice
 Eric Hansen - bass, lute
 Jackson Berkey - Baldwin S-10 piano, Davis harpsichord, clavichord, toy piano, Prophet 5 synthesizer, Fender Rhodes, camel bells, vocals
 Ron Cooley - 6 and 12-string guitars
 Willis Ann Ross - flute and recorder
 David "High D" Kappy - French horn
 Mary Walter - harp
 String section includes Steve Shipps (concertmaster), Richard Lohmann, Richard Altenbach, Grace Granata, Deborah Fuller, Scott Shoemaker (violins), Michelle Brill, Michael Strauss, Roxanne Adams (violas), David Low, Kim Rockshaw, Greg Clinton (cellos), Wayne Anderson, and Bill Ritchie (double basses)
 Ron Dabbs - camel bells, sound effects engineer
 Louis Davis Sr. - keyboard technician

References 

1984 Christmas albums
Mannheim Steamroller albums
Christmas albums by American artists
American Gramaphone albums
American Gramaphone Christmas albums
Classical Christmas albums
Instrumental albums
New-age Christmas albums